HMG-box transcription factor 1, also known as HBP1, is a human protein.

Interactions
HBP1 has been shown to interact with SIN3A and Retinoblastoma protein.

References

Further reading

External links 
 

Transcription factors